Daniel Edward Riley (November 28, 1860 – April 27, 1948) was a Canadian politician, insurance agent, rancher and real estate agent from Alberta, Canada.

Early life
Daniel Edward Riley was born on November 28, 1860 in Baltic, Prince Edward Island to Neil Riley and Grace McEacheran. He was educated at Fanning Grammar School in Malpecque and Charlottetown Normal School. He would marry Edith Kate Thompson on April 2, 1890 and have five sons together. In 1882 he would move west, first to Winnipeg to work in the Canadian Pacific Railway shops, and later settling in High River, Alberta. He would become a ranch hand and manager for William Roper Hull and volunteered as a dispatch rider during the North-West Rebellion.

Political life

Riley would serve as the first Mayor of High River when the Village became a Town in 1906. He would also serve as the founding President of the United Farmers of Alberta High River Local in 1909.

Riley would first contest the 1917 Alberta general election in the High River electoral district as a member of the Alberta Liberal Party. He would be defeated by incumbent Conservative candidate George Douglas Stanley by 38 votes.

Riley helped to found the Western Stock Growers’ Association and served various positions in the organization from 1921 to 1937.

Riley was appointed to the Senate of Canada on the advice of Mackenzie King on June 26, 1926 and served until his death at Holy Cross Hospital in Calgary, on April 27, 1948.

Legacy
He was inducted into the Canadian Agricultural Hall of Fame posthumously in 1965. The Senator Riley Junior High School in High River is named in his honour.

References

External links

Daniel Edward Riley biography Canadian Agricultural Hall of Fame Association

1860 births
1948 deaths
Canadian senators from Alberta
Liberal Party of Canada senators
Alberta Liberal Party candidates in Alberta provincial elections
Mayors of places in Alberta
Canadian ranchers